Statistics of the 1968 Cameroonian Premier League season.

Overview
Caïman Douala won the championship.

References
Cameroon 1968 - List of final tables (RSSSF)

1968 in Cameroonian football
Cam
Cam
Elite One seasons